Estadio General Pablo Rojas (locally known as La Olla or La Nueva Olla) is a football stadium in the neighbourhood of Barrio Obrero in Asunción, Paraguay. It is the home venue of Cerro Porteño. The stadium's nickname La Olla was given by the club's former president General Pablo Rojas, whose name took the stadium when he died. This stadium was used during the 1999 Copa América, hosting games by Uruguay and Colombia. Since 2015, the stadium is undergoing expansion and remodeling works in order to increase its capacity to 51,237 people. The stadium counts with balconies, car parking, food courts and canteens in all sectors.

History
On 24 May 1970, the stadium was inaugurated. Following the stadium's inauguration in 1970, was a match between Cerro Porteño and Club Silvio Pettirossi. It underwent renovations in 1980, 2009 and between 2015 and 2017. Since 1970, the stadium in its original layout was not completely closed. The south-eastern part remained open as a result of a house whose owners refused to sell until 38 years later, allowing the last terrace to be erected in the year 2009, and after this all sides of the stadium became enclosed.

2015-2017 renovation
The renovation design between 2015 and 2017 was by Alfredo Angulo. During the 2015 reconstruction, the playing field was significantly lowered, which enabled the first ever field-level private boxes in Paraguay. Its grandstand was demolished to add a 5,000-seat upper tier to the north stand and a smaller upper tier was created above the east and south stands. Its main grandstand gained floor space and dozens of skyboxes, which played crucial role in the financing of the entire scheme. The stadium was smoothened significantly and remained asymmetric. Members of the club's barra brava worked for 18-months on the stadium's construction in a publicity campaign which helped their image and also created a stronger bond between the fans and the stadium.

The renovated stadium was reinaugurated on 19 August 2017 with a ceremony that CONMEBOL president Alejandro Domínguez attended. Following the ceremony, a friendly match was played between Cerro Porteño and Argentine club Boca Juniors. Boca won the match 2–1.

Concerts

See also
 List of association football stadia by capacity

References

External links
 
 Cerro website
 Stadium images

Football venues in Asunción
Sports venues completed in 1992
Estadio General Pablo Rojas
Sports venues in Asunción
Copa América stadiums